Abraham Sprachman (15 January 1896 – 6 August 1971) was a Canadian architect. In 1922, he founded Kaplan & Sprachman with Harold Kaplan, which is mostly recognized for designing many movie theaters across Canada from the 1920s to the 1950s, and also for designing synagogues and buildings for the Jewish communities. His work was part of the architecture event in the art competition at the 1948 Summer Olympics.

Kaplan & Sprachman designed the Eglinton Theatre in Toronto and the Vogue Theatre which were both designated National Historic Sites by the Historic Sites and Monuments Board of Canada.

His son, Mandel, was also a noted architect.

References

External links
 

1896 births
1971 deaths
20th-century Canadian architects
Olympic competitors in art competitions
People from Ivano-Frankivsk Oblast
People from the Kingdom of Galicia and Lodomeria
Jews from Galicia (Eastern Europe)
Austro-Hungarian Jews
Ukrainian Jews